Jacques Vaché (7 September 1895 – 6 January 1919) was a friend of André Breton, the founder of surrealism. Vaché was one of the chief inspirations behind the Surrealist movement. As Breton said:

"En littérature, je me suis successivement épris de Rimbaud, de Jarry, d'Apollinaire, de Nouveau, de Lautréamont, mais c'est à Jacques Vaché que je dois le plus"

("In literature, I was successively taken with Rimbaud, with Jarry, with Apollinaire, with Nouveau, with Lautréamont, but it is Jacques Vaché to whom I owe the most")

He was born on 7 September 1895 in Lorient, France, and died in a hotel room in Nantes on 6 January 1919 from an overdose of opium. Alongside him lay the naked body of another French soldier. André Breton believed his death to be a suicide. He was known for his indifference and for wearing a monocle.

References

 Lettres de guerre - with essays by André Breton (Au Sans Pareil, 1919)
 Jacques Vaché by Bertrand Lacarelle (Grasset, 2005)
 4 Dada Suicides: Selected Texts of Arthur Cravan, Jacques Rigaut, Julien Torma & Jacques Vaché (Anti-Classics of Dada) by Vaché, Jacques Rigaut, Julien Torma, and Arthur Cravan. Roger Conover, Terry J. Hale, Paul Lenti, and Iain White (editors), 1995, Atlas Press; 
 Jacques Vaché and the Roots of Surrealism: Including Vaché's War Letters & Other Writings by Franklin Rosemont. Charles H Kerr Company Publishers, 2008;

External links 
 Electronic text of Lettres de guerre at the Digital Dada Library

1895 births
1919 suicides
Dada
French surrealist writers
French male poets
20th-century French poets
20th-century French male writers
French military personnel of World War I